The 1994–95 Minnesota Golden Gophers men's basketball team represented the University of Minnesota as a member of the Big Ten Conference during the 1994–95 NCAA Division I men's basketball season. Led by 9th-year head coach Clem Haskins, the Golden Gophers advanced to the NCAA tournament and finished with a 19–12 record (10–8 Big Ten; overall record later adjusted to 20–11).

Roster

Schedule and results

|-
!colspan=9 style=| Non-conference Regular Season

|-
!colspan=9 style=| Big Ten Regular Season

|-
!colspan=9 style=| NCAA Tournament

Rankings

References

Minnesota Golden Gophers men's basketball seasons
Minnesota
Minnesota
Minne
Minne